The Antigua and Barbuda National Olympic Committee (IOC code: ANT) is the National Olympic Committee representing Antigua and Barbuda. It is also the body responsible for Antigua and Barbuda's representation at the Commonwealth Games.

See also
Antigua and Barbuda at the Olympics
Antigua and Barbuda at the Commonwealth Games

References

External links
 Official website

Antigua and Barbuda
Antigua and Barbuda
Antigua and Barbuda at the Olympics
Sports governing bodies in Antigua and Barbuda
Sports organizations established in 1966
1966 establishments in Antigua and Barbuda